Gu Changwei (born 12 December 1957) is a Chinese cinematographer and film director. Gu was born in Xi'an, Shaanxi in the People's Republic of China. Gu is considered one of the major Chinese cinematographers working today.

Career
Gu Changwei began his cinematic career in the now legendary 1982 class of the Beijing Film Academy, today known as the Fifth Generation. Trained as a cinematographer, Gu was assigned to the Xi'an Film Studio after graduation where he served as a primary collaborator with classmates Chen Kaige and Zhang Yimou on their early films, notably King of the Children  (for Chen Kaige) and Red Sorghum (for Zhang Yimou), both in 1987. Since then, Gu has worked with both men on multiple occasions, including on Chen's magnum opus, 1993's Farewell My Concubine. Like fellow cinematographer Zhao Fei, Gu has had the opportunity to work with major American directors as well, notably with Robert Altman, on his film The Gingerbread Man (1997).

Directing
Beginning in 2005, Gu Changwei branched out into film direction with his debut Peacock, a three-hour-long epic about a small family in the 1970s and 1980s. The film was well received and won the Jury Grand Prix-Silver Bear at the 2005 Berlin International Film Festival. His sophomore feature, And the Spring Comes, was released in 2007.

Filmography

As cinematographer

As film director

References

External links
 
 
 Gu Changwei at the Internet Encyclopedia of Cinematographers
 New York Times

Chinese cinematographers
Film directors from Shaanxi
Artists from Xi'an
Beijing Film Academy alumni
1957 births
Living people

Chinese film directors